Kaleri is a pejorative name for the Horom or Barkul language.